In mathematical analysis, initialization of the differintegrals is a topic in fractional calculus.

Composition rule of differintegral

A certain counterintuitive property of the differintegral operator should be pointed out, namely the composition law. Although

wherein D−q is the left inverse of Dq, the converse is not necessarily true:

Example

It is instructive to consider elementary integer-order calculus to see what's happening. First, integrate then differentiate, using the example function 3x2 + 1:

on exchanging the order of composition:

in which the constant of integration is c. Even if it wasn't obvious, the initialization terms ƒ'(0) = c, ƒ''(0) = d, etc. could be used. If we neglected those initialization terms, the last equation would show the composition of integration then differentiation (and vice versa) would not hold.

Description of initialization

This is the problem that with the differintegral.  If the differintegral is initialized properly, then the hoped-for composition law holds.  The problem is that in differentiation, we lose information, as we lost the c in the first equation.

In fractional calculus, however, since the operator has been fractionalized and is thus continuous, an entire complementary function is needed, not just a constant or set of constants.  We call this complementary function .

Working with a properly initialized differintegral is the subject of initialized fractional calculus.

See also

Initial conditions
Dynamical systems

References
  (technical report).

Fractional calculus